Lac-Duparquet is an unorganized territory in the Abitibi-Témiscamingue region of Quebec, Canada. It is one of two unorganized territories in the Abitibi-Ouest Regional County Municipality but the only one without a permanent population. It is located between Duparquet Lake and the Quebec/Ontario border.

Demographics
Population:
 Population in 2016: 0
 Population in 2011: 0
 Population in 2006: 0
 Population in 2001: 0

References

Unorganized territories in Abitibi-Témiscamingue